Wurlitzer Building may refer to:

Wurlitzer Building, a former Wurlitzer office building in Detroit
Wurlitzer Building, a now demolished early 20th century highrise building in Manhattan, between 41st and 42nd Streets at 6th Avenue
WurliTzer Building (built 1923), also known as the Apparel Center Building, located on Broadway in Downtown Los Angeles.
North Tonawanda Barrel Organ Factory, also known locally as the Wurlitzer Building, an organ factory turned office complex in North Tonawanda, New York